Milan Lutonský (born 10 August 1993 in Brno) is a Czech football player who plays for SK Líšeň.

Career
On 14 January 2019, Lutonský joined FK Jablonec and was immediately loaned out to 1. SK Prostějov.

References

External links
 Profile at FC Zbrojovka Brno official site
 Profile at fotbal.idnes.cz
 

1993 births
Living people
Czech footballers
Czech First League players
FC Zbrojovka Brno players
FK Jablonec players
1. SK Prostějov players
Czech National Football League players
Association football midfielders
Footballers from Brno
Czech Republic youth international footballers
SK Líšeň players